Alhang is a hill in the Carsphairn and Scaur Hills range, part of the Southern Uplands of Scotland. It is the lowest Donald hill in the range; Meikledodd Hill is 1m higher. The northern slopes of the hill are the source of the River Afton. It is most easily climbed from the Water of Ken to the east or as a round from Glen Afton to the north.

Subsidiary SMC Summits

References

Donald mountains
Mountains and hills of the Southern Uplands
Mountains and hills of Dumfries and Galloway